Almoloya de Alquisiras is a town and municipality, in Mexico State in Mexico. The municipality covers an area of 167.38 km².

As of 2005, the municipality had a total population of 14,196.

Politics

References

Municipalities of the State of Mexico
Populated places in the State of Mexico